The Association of Reformed Evangelical Churches of Burkina Faso or the Eglises evangéliques réformées du Burkina Faso abbreviated AEERB was started in 1977 by Kinza Lazare with 30 members. He was separated from the Pentecostal Assemblies of God a Pentecostal denomination. Pastor Lazare studied in Benin, Theological Institution of Porto Novo, where he was acquainted with the Reformed Presbyterian tradition. This association was officially founded in 1986. Local congregations concentrated mainly in the northern part of the country, and Ouagadougou. This work focused on the north side of the country. The church is engaged in rural developments.

The church has 40,000 members and 40 congregations and 18 house fellowships. The Reformed Evangelical Church subscribes the Apostles Creed, Nicene Creed and the Heidelberg Catechism. Member of the World Communion of Reformed Churches.
The church is growing quickly.

References

Reformed denominations in Africa
Christianity in Burkina Faso
Members of the World Communion of Reformed Churches
Presbyterian denominations
1977 establishments in Upper Volta